Jacinda is a given name. Notable people with the name include:

 Jacinda Ardern (born 1980), former prime minister of New Zealand
 Jacinda Barclay (1991–2020), Australian sportswoman
 Jacinda Barrett (born 1972), Australian-American actress and model
 Jacinda Vidrio, a fictional character in the TV series Once Upon a Time

See also
 Jacinta, another given name

Feminine given names